Honda began researching All Terrain Vehicles as early as 1967. Within 18 months they had designed and shipped their first three-wheeled vehicle, designated US90, as a 1970 model. Honda's dominance of the ATC market peaked in 1984, with 370,000 units shipped and a 69% market share. In 1985, Honda offered their most diverse line-up, with ten models available. Honda remained the leader in production and sales until voluntarily exiting the ATC market in 1987.

Production models
ATC70, 1973–74, 1978–85
ATC90, 1974–1978
US90, 1970–1973
ATC110, 1979–1985
ATC125M, 1984–1987
ATC185, 1980
ATC185S, 1981–1983
ATC200, 1981–1983
ATC200E, 1983–1984
ATC200ES, 1984
ATC200M, 1984–1985
ATC200S and ATC200X, 1984–1986
ATC250SX, 1985–1987
ATC350X, 1985–1986

References

Honda ATVs
Honda three-wheeled all-terrain vehicles